Steve Curtis   (born 9 June 1964, in Wimbledon) is an English eight time offshore powerboat racing World Champion.

Curtis's father Clive ran boat-building business Cougar Marine, and also was a powerboat racer, making entry to the watercraft racing world easier for his son, after leaving school aged 17. Before switching to boats in 1983, Curtis had a career as a motocross rider, winning the British schoolboy and junior motocross championships.

Curtis won his first title in the United States at age 21 in 1985, becoming the youngest ever Class 1 champion and the first Briton to win the title. He won his second title in 1987, and in 1998 he won his third title as throttleman on Spirit of Norway, with driving partner Bjørn Rune Gjelsten. The pairing became the most successful team in Class 1 so far: Since that date, his other achievements include:
 The World Championship - 1997, 1998, 2002, 2003, 2004
 The European Championship - 1998, 2002, 2003
 The Middle East Championship - 2003, 2004
 The Pole Position Championship - 2001, 2002, 2003, 2004

In 2005 Gjelsten retired, and Bard Eker took over as owner/pilot of Spirit of Norway, and he and Curtis took the championship again. Curtis again paired with Gjelsten in 2006, when they garnered all four world titles (World Championship, Pole Position Championship, Middle East and European titles).

Curtis runs his family business, Cougar Marine, based in Hampshire. He won the Segrave Trophy in 2003 and was awarded an MBE in the Queen's 80th Birthday Honours list.

Curtis won the SBIP-APBA Offshore World Championship in 1987, becoming the first Briton to do so and again in 2008 with Tom Abrams.

During the 2019 APBA National Championship, Curtis raced Miss GEICO in Class One International with Miles Jennings.

In 2019, Curtis became an ambassador for the Offshore Model Racing Association in the United Kingdom.

References

External links
 Cougar Marine powerboats

1964 births
Living people
People from Wimbledon, London
British motorboat racers
Members of the Order of the British Empire
Segrave Trophy recipients